Ji County, also known by it Chinese name Jixian, is a county in the west of the prefecture-level city of Linfen, in southwestern Shanxi Province, China. The county spans an area of approximately 1,780 square kilometers, and has a population of approximately 110,000 people as of 2013.

History
Under the Zhou, the area of present-day Ji County was part of the territory of Jin. Its principal town Erqu was the seat of the appenage given to Duke Xian's son Ji Yiwu, who later became known as Duke Hui.

During the Three Kingdoms Period, the area belonged to the  within the Cao Wei.

The area belonged to the Northern Wei Dynasty, undergoing numerous administrative changes during the 5th Century. The area then belonged to the Northern Qi and then the Northern Zhou Dynasty.

The area belonged to the Sui Dynasty upon its establishment in 581 CE, and was incorporated as the Jiyang Commandery. In 584 CE, the Jiyang Commandery was abolished, and was merged into the newly formed .

The Jinnan Prefecture was abolished in 1970, and Ji County fell under the jurisdiction of the newly-formed .

In 2000, the Linfen Prefecture was changed to the prefecture-level city of Linfen.

The county was afflicted by the 2021 China floods, which flooded the Yellow River, destroying buildings throughout the county.

Geography 
The county spans approximately 1,780 square kilometers in area, bordering Yaodu District and Pu County to its east, Xiangning County to its south, Yichuan County to its west, and Daning County to its north.

The county is located at the southern end of the Lüliang Mountains. The county is home to the Hukou Waterfall.

Climate

Administrative divisions 
Ji County is divided into three towns and five townships.

References

County-level divisions of Shanxi